Kathleen Sims (June 6, 1942 – July 5, 2019) was an American politician. She served as a Republican Idaho State Representative for District 4 in the B seat for 2010 to 2016. She was previously appointed as the Idaho State Senator for District 4 to fill the vacancy when Jack Riggs resigned to serve as lieutenant governor; Sims served from 2000 until 2002.

Early life and career 
Sims was born in Spokane, Washington. She graduated from North Idaho Junior College with a degree in accounting. Sims owned the Honda Auto and Motorcycle  dealership in Coeur d'Alene, Idaho.

Elections and legislative service
At the Idaho Republican Party Convention held at Nampa, Idaho June 2016 Sims along with Blackfoot sheepherder Mike Duff lost against incumbent Steve Yates for State Chair of the party.

Idaho House of Representatives District 4 Seat B

2016 
Sims lost the Republican primary election to Paul Amador, 48.4% to 51.6%.

2012 
Sims was unopposed in the Republican Primary.

She defeated Democratic challenger Anne L. Nesse in the November 6, 2012, general election, 56.76% to 43.24%.

2010 
Sims sought the open District 4B seat vacated by retiring Democratic Representative George C. Sayler
She was unopposed in the May 25, 2010, Republican primary and won with 2,720 votes. Sims won the November 2, 2010, general election with 7,242 votes (58.1%) against Paula Marano (D).

Idaho Senate District 4

2002 
Due to redistricting, Sims faced fellow Republican Senator John W. Goedde in the May 28, 2002, primary, losing by 31 votes.

2000 
Sims was appointed to fill the vacancy after Senator Jack Riggs resigned to fill the vacancy made by Lieutenant Governor Butch Otter, who won election to the U.S. House of Representatives for Idaho's 1st congressional district.

References

External links
Kathleen Sims at the Idaho Legislature

1942 births
2019 deaths
Republican Party Idaho state senators
Republican Party members of the Idaho House of Representatives
People from Coeur d'Alene, Idaho
Politicians from Spokane, Washington
Women state legislators in Idaho
21st-century American politicians
21st-century American women politicians
American automobile salespeople
Businesspeople from Idaho
Businesspeople from Spokane, Washington
20th-century American businesspeople
20th-century American businesswomen